Jens Edman (born 28 December 1976, in Ankarsrum) is a Swedish auto racing driver.

Career
Most of his career has been spent in Touring car racing, including the Swedish Touring Car Championship, with a best season finish of third in 2001 driving for Flash Engineering in a Volvo S40. More recently he has competed in the Danish Touring Car Championship, where he also ended the year in third, in the 2005 season. In 2006, he entered selected rounds of the FIA World Touring Car Championship with a Peugeot 407 for Peugeot Sport Denmark. In 2009, Edman returned to racing back home in Sweden, for Dealer Sport Saab Performance in the STCC.

Complete WTCC results
(key) (Races in bold indicate pole position) (Races in italics indicate fastest lap)

References

1976 births
Living people
Swedish racing drivers
Swedish Touring Car Championship drivers
Danish Touring Car Championship drivers
World Touring Car Championship drivers
European Touring Car Championship drivers
European Touring Car Cup drivers